The Cavalier from Kruja (Italian: Il cavaliere di Kruja) is a 1940 Italian war film directed by Carlo Campogalliani and starring Doris Duranti, Antonio Centa and Leda Gloria. The film portrays the 1939 Italian invasion of Albania. It was made as a propaganda work in support of the Fascist regime of Benito Mussolini.

Cast
 Antonio Centa as Stafano Andriani
 Doris Duranti as Eliana Haidar  
 Leda Gloria as Alidjé 
 Guido Celano as Hasslan Haidar  
 Nico Pepe as Mario Marini 
 Giuseppe Rinaldi as Essad Haidar  
 Vasco Creti as Ilias Haidar  
 Arnaldo Arnaldi as Mirko 
 Oscar Andriani as Il capo della polizia  
 Dino Di Luca as Osman  
 Carlo Duse as Argiropulos  
 Katiuscia Odinzova as Miss Parker  
 Emilio Petacci as L'operaio italiano Ferrero 
 Walter Lazzaro as Magnani  
 Luigi Carini    
 Noëlle Norman

References

Bibliography 
 Liehm, Mira. Passion and Defiance: Film in Italy from 1942 to the Present. University of California Press, 1984.

External links 
 

1940 films
Italian war films
Italian black-and-white films
1940 war films
1940s Italian-language films
Films directed by Carlo Campogalliani
Films set in Albania
Films set in 1939
World War II propaganda films
Italian World War II films
1940s Italian films
Italian propaganda films